Eberhard Freitag (born 19 May 1942, in Mühlacker) is a German mathematician, specializing in complex analysis and especially modular forms.

Education and career
Freitag studied from 1961 mathematics, physics and astronomy at Heidelberg University, where he received in 1964 his Diplom and in 1966 his Ph.D. (promotion), supervised by Hans Maaß (and also Albrecht Dold), with thesis Modulformen zweiten Grades zum rationalen und Gaußschen Zahlkörper, published in Sitzungsberichte Heidelberger Akad. Wiss. 1967. From 1964 he was a research assistant at the Mathematischen Institut in Heidelberg, where he received at the end of 1969 his habilitation and became there a Privatdozent and in 1970 a scientific advisor. In 1970–1971 he was a visiting professor at Johann-Wolfgang-Goethe-Universität Frankfurt am Main. In 1973 he became a professor ordinarius at the University of Mainz. In 1977 he became a professor ordinarius at Heidelberg University, where from 1991 to 1993 he was the dean of the Faculty of Mathematics.

Freitag's research (like that of his teacher Maaß) deals primarily with the theory of modular forms, but approaches modular forms via algebraic geometry. Among other work, Freitag described this theory in two monographs published by Springer Verlag in Grundlehren der mathematischen Wissenschaften. These two books and the first volume of his series on function theory are standard references. In 1974 in Vancouver he was an Invited Speaker of the ICM with talk Singularitäten von Modulmannigfaltigkeiten und Körper Automorpher Funktionen. In 1998 he proved with Rainer Weissauer and Richard Borcherds the existence of a Siegel cusp form of degree 12 and weight 12 using the theta series associated with the 24 Niemeier lattices of dimension 24. Freitag also demonstrated that the Siegel modular variety Ag is of general type when g = 8.

Selected publications
 with Rolf Busam: Funktionentheorie 1. Springer-Verlag, 1993, 4th edition 2006, Complex Analysis, 2006, Eng. trans. of 4th edition
 Funktionentheorie 2: Riemannsche Flächen, Mehrere komplexe Variable, Abelsche Funktionen, Höhere Modulformen, Springer-Verlag, 2009
 Hilbert Modular Forms. Springer-Verlag, Grundlehren der mathematischen Wissenschaften, 1990,  2013 pbk reprint
 Singular Modular Forms and Theta Relations. In: Lecture Notes in Mathematics. vol. 1487, Springer-Verlag, 1991, ; 2006 pbk reprint
 with Reinhardt Kiehl: Etale Cohomology and the Weil Conjecture, Springer Verlag, 1988, 
 Siegelsche Modulfunktionen. Springer-Verlag, Berlin 1983, Grundlehren der mathematischen Wissenschaften vol. 254,

Sources
 Dagmar Drüll Heidelberger Gelehrtenlexikon 1933-1986, Springer 2009

References

External links
 Freitag's homepage at the University of Heidelberg
 List of reprints and preprints (with short descriptions) of some papers by Eberhard Freitag, University of Heidelberg

1942 births
Living people
20th-century German mathematicians
21st-century German mathematicians
Complex analysts
Heidelberg University alumni
Academic staff of Johannes Gutenberg University Mainz
Academic staff of Heidelberg University
People from Mühlacker